The European Tour 2015/2016 – Event 4 (also known as the 2015 Victoria Bulgarian Open) was a professional minor-ranking snooker tournament held between 4–8 November 2015 in Sofia, Bulgaria.

The first two days consisted of preliminary rounds. 31 players qualified through these rounds to reach the last-128 stage of the tournament. Days 3 and 4 consist edof 3 rounds; the top half of the draw playing on day 3 and bottom half on day 4. The remaining 16 players played to a conclusion on day 5. All matches were the best of 7 frames.

Mark Allen beat Ryan Day 4–0 in the final. It was his fifth European Tour victory but his first win since August 2014 when he won the 2014 Paul Hunter Classic. The victory gave him entry to the 2015 Champion of Champions which was played the following week.

Prize fund
The breakdown of prize money of the event is shown below:

Main draw

Preliminary rounds

Round 1
Best of 7 frames

Round 2
Best of 7 frames

Main rounds

Top half

Section 1

Section 2

Section 3

Section 4

Bottom half

Section 5

Section 6

Section 7

Section 8

Finals

Century breaks 

138, 133, 104  Dominic Dale
133  Barry Pinches
130, 124  Sam Baird
129  Aditya Mehta
128, 127, 118, 111, 100  Mark Williams
127, 102, 100  Mark Allen
126, 119, 111  Judd Trump
126, 110  Ryan Day
123, 114, 109, 106  Joe Perry
123, 112  Xiao Guodong
123  Ricky Walden
119, 102  Peter Ebdon
118, 106, 100, 100  Shaun Murphy
116  John Higgins
116  Jimmy Robertson

115  Andrew Higginson
115  Zak Surety
112  Joel Walker
112  Mitchell Mann
111, 105  Michael White
110  Michael Holt
109  Stuart Carrington
107  Josh Boileau
106  Mark Selby
103, 103  Daniel Wells
103  Jack Lisowski
102  Anthony McGill
100  Michael Wasley
100  Eden Sharav
100  Ryan Causton

References

ET4
Bulgarian Open
2015 in Bulgarian sport